Satterlee, Satterley, or Satterly is a surname of English origin from Satterleigh in Devon, England.

Distribution

United States 
According to the 2010 United States Census, Satterly is the 23,185th most common surname in the United States, belonging to 1,100 individuals. Satterly is most common among White (97.45%) individuals.

People 

 Jack Satterly, Canadian geologist and discoverer of satterlyite in or before 1978.
Jessica Satterley (born 1981), known as Jessica Garlick, Welsh pop singer
Benjamin Satterley (born 1986), known as Pac, wrestler
Nigel Satterley, founder of Satterley Property Group, Australian property development company

Fictional characters 
 Mrs. Satterly, 1959 British thriller film Jet Storm
 Roy Satterly, 2007 American television natural horror film Maneater

Further reading 
 Satterlee Moffatt, Goldie. "Satterlee-ley-ly & Allied Families Genealogy", volumes 1-4

References

External links 

English-language surnames
Patronymic surnames
Surnames of English origin